Nan Thuzar Win (also spelt Nang Thuzar Win; born 25 August 1981) is a Burmese politician who currently serves as a deputy speaker of Kayin State Hluttaw and a
member of parliament in the Kayin State Hluttaw for Kawkareik Township № 1 Constituency. She is a member of the National League for Democracy.

Early life
Nan was born on 25 August 1981 in Kayin State, Myanmar. She graduated with L.L.B. Her previous job is attorney .

Political career 
In the 2015 Myanmar general election, she contested the Kayin State Hluttaw from Kawkareik Township № 1 parliamentary constituency. She is currently serves as deputy speaker of Kayin State Hluttaw .

References

1981 births
Living people
National League for Democracy politicians